The 2009 America East Conference baseball tournament took place from May 21 through 23 at Pete Sylvester Field in Endicott, New York. The top four regular season finishers of the league's seven teams qualified for the double-elimination tournament. In the championship game, first-seeded Binghamton defeated second-seeded Albany, 16-6, to win its first tournament championship. As a result, Binghamton received the America East's automatic bid to the 2009 NCAA Tournament, the program's first.

Seeding 
The top four finishers from the regular season were seeded one through four based on conference winning percentage only. They then played in a double-elimination format. In the first round, the one and four seeds were matched up in one game, while the two and three seeds were matched up in the other.

Results

All-Tournament Team 
The following players were named to the All-Tournament Team.

Most Outstanding Player 
Binghamton second baseman Jim Calderone was named Most Outstanding Player.

References 

America East Conference Baseball Tournament
Tournament
American East Conference baseball tournament
America East Conference baseball tournament
College baseball tournaments in New York (state)